NGC 548, also occasionally referred to as PGC 5326 or UGC 1010, is an elliptical galaxy in the constellation Cetus. It is located approximately 244 million light-years from the Solar System and was discovered on 2 November 1867 by American astronomer George Mary Searle.

Observation history 
Searle discovered NGC 548 at Harvard Observatory using a 15" Merz refractor telescope. His given micrometric position also matches UGC 1010 and PGC 5326.

See also 
 Elliptical galaxy 
 List of NGC objects (1–1000)
 Cetus

References

External links 

 
 SEDS

Elliptical galaxies
Cetus (constellation)
0548
5326
Astronomical objects discovered in 1867
Discoveries by George Searle